Elpidia Carrillo (born August 16, 1961) is a Mexican actress and director. Her career includes roles in both Latin American and US film and television. She is best known in the United States for her supporting role in the iconic action film Predator, Bread and Roses, and Nine Lives.

She was nominated for an Independent Spirit Award for Best Female Lead for her performance in Salvador. She is known for the role Tecuichpo in the independent film The Other Conquest.

Early life 
Carrillo was born in Santa Elena, Michoacán, Mexico, a rural mountain town.  One of eight children in a family of farm laborers, her childhood was marked by violence and poverty. At the age of three, her father was murdered, forcing her eldest brother to assume control of the family.  Wanting Carrillo to get an education, he forged a birth certificate so she could begin first grade at age four.

When she was six, her brother was also gunned down outside a theater and the family faced constant threats to their lives. When she was ten, Carrillo moved to the town of Uruapan with an older sister where she dropped out of school as she began working alongside her sister at a Chinese restaurant.

Career

Early career 
Carrillo was discovered by a local photographer in Uruapan, Mexico and soon received a modeling contract. At 12 years old, director Rafael Corkidi cast Elpidia as Malinche in the surrealist Mexican feature film Pafnucio Santo.  The film was Mexico's official submission to the Academy Awards that year, but with its many esoteric elements, it failed to garner a nomination.  Due to the role involving nudity and her being under age, Carrillo was credited under the fake name Piya.  Corkidi cast Carrillo again for a larger role in his film Deseos.

By the age of 16, she had shot her first lead role in the controversial Mexican feature Nuevo Mundo, directed by Gabriel Retes.  Having worked numerous films, she decided to enroll in the Bellas Arts School in Mexico City.

Hollywood career 
After numerous Mexican and International film and television credits, Carrillo's US film career quickly emerged as she did a series of critically acclaimed roles in award nominated US projects.  Her first US film came when Academy Award winning director Tony Richardson cast her in a co-starring role in the film The Border opposite Jack Nicholson and Harvey Keitel.  That was soon followed by a co-starring role in the British drama Beyond the Limit opposite Richard Gere, Michael Caine, and Bob Hoskins, with the latter two British actors receiving BAFTA Nominations for their performances.

For her third US film, Carrillo performed a small supporting role in another successful Academy Award nominated art film Under Fire for which Gene Hackman's performance received a Golden Globe nomination.

Next she made her US television debut in the role of Coana in the Primetime Emmy nominated mini-series Christopher Columbus.

Her first award nomination came when Oliver Stone cast her as the female lead of Maria in Salvador which earned Carrillo an Independent Spirit Award nomination for Best Female Lead, earned her co-star James Woods an Academy Award Nomination for Best Actor in a Leading Role, and earned Oliver Stone an Academy Award nomination with co-writer Rick Boyle for Best Original Screenplay, which they would both lose to Stone's other nominated screenplay that year, Platoon.

With awards and critical recognition all by the age of 25, Carrillo then accepted what would be one of the most recognizable and commercially successful roles of her career as only actress appearing in the 1987 action film Predator opposite Arnold Schwarzenegger, Carl Weathers, Shane Black, and Jesse Ventura. Predator is widely considered the most commercially successful film of Carrillo's career and her most recognizable role.  Though initially weakly received by critics, the film has subsequently gone on to become an action film classic making numerous "best of" lists in later years. At the time of its release, the film received an Oscar nomination for Best Visual Effects.

Post commercial success
Following the commercial success of Predator, and performances in television guest starring roles on commercially successful shows like Miami Vice and 21 Jump Street, Carrillo increasingly focused her career once again on US critical appealing roles in film and television, as well as returning to Mexican independent cinema with roles in a number of international award winning films including Guldbagge Award winning La Hija del Puma, Una Cita con el Destino, Ariel Award winning City of the Blind, and the Guillermo del Toro produced Un Embrujo, a winner of 9 Ariel Awards.

Carrillo appeared in Gregory Nava's Mexican-American film My Family playing Isabel Magaña, the El Salvadorean refugee wife of Jimmy Smits, who won the Independent Spirit Award for Best Male Lead for the role.  The film also won the Casting Society of America's Artios Award for Best Casting for a Drama Feature.

Johnny Depp cast her as the female lead of his only directorial effort, the controversial The Brave, which he also starred in along with Marlon Brando.  Despite the highly acclaimed cast and Palme d'Or nomination at the 1997 Cannes Film Festival, the dark subject and mixed reception resulted in the film only receiving an international theatrical release.

Despite the critical recognition and various nominations throughout her career, Carrillo's first US acting award win was for her performance as Rosa in the drama Bread and Roses, which was nominated for the Palme d'Or at the 2000 Cannes Film Festival.  Carrillo would go on to win the 2002 ALMA Award for Outstanding Supporting Actress in a Motion Picture, but in an improbable twist, she tied with Elizabeth Peña for the award.  During the telecast, both women came to the podium together and shared time in giving their acceptance speeches.

Carrillo would win the same award four years later, this time as sole recipient of the 2006 ALMA Award for Outstanding Supporting Actress in a Motion Picture for her performance as Sandra in Nine Lives written and directed by Rodrigo García.  This was soon followed by a co-starring role in the commercially successful film Seven Pounds which starred Will Smith and went on to earn $165M at the box office.

Rodrigo García would then once again cast Carrillo, this time to co-star in the ensemble drama Mother and Child, this time sharing the screen and not the podium with Elizabeth Peña as well as Annette Bening, with whom she shares the majority of her scenes.  The ensemble film also featured her former My Family co-star Jimmy Smits and actors Naomi Watts, Kerry Washington, and Samuel L. Jackson. The film premiered at the 2009 Toronto International Film Festival and Sundance Film Festival.

Later career
Carrillo returned to star in the Mexican family comedy Familia Gang and the independent features Relentless and Foreign Land.

She made her return to television with a major recurring arc as Linda Brenner on the highly decorated ABC series Nashville and a guest starring role as President Daphne Tejeda on Madam Secretary.

Filmography

References

External links
 
 Elpidia Carrillo at The Other Conquest official website

1961 births
Mexican expatriates in the United States
Living people
Mexican film actresses
People from Parácuaro
Actresses from Michoacán